Torkeh-ye Sofla may refer to:
Torkeh-ye Sofla, Dalahu
Torkeh-ye Sofla, Javanrud